Gerald Neil (born 22 August 1978 in Kingston) is a Jamaican football defender.

Club career
Nicknamed 'Kunte', he currently plays rightback for August Town F.C. in the top flight Jamaica National Premier League.

International career
He made his debut for the Reggae Boyz in 2003 against Cuba and played his last against Guatemala in 2004. He earned a total of 18 caps, scoring no goals.

External links
 
 Profile at Golocaljamaica

1978 births
Living people
Sportspeople from Kingston, Jamaica
Jamaican footballers
Jamaica international footballers
Arnett Gardens F.C. players
2003 CONCACAF Gold Cup players
Association football defenders
National Premier League players